{{Infobox television
| image                = Meteor Garden (2018) poster.jpg
| caption              = Promotional poster
| alt_name             = 
| genre                = 
| based_on             = Meteor Garden, 
| writer               = Sharon Mao
| director             = Lin Helong
| starring             = 
| voices               = 
| opentheme            = "For You" by Dylan Wang (王鹤棣), Darren Chen (官鸿), Caesar Wu (吴希泽), Connor Leong (梁靖康)
| endtheme             = "Love Exists" (爱，存在) by Kiki Wei (魏奇奇)
| composer             = 
| country              = China
| language             = Mandarin
| num_seasons          = 1
| num_episodes         = 
| producer             = Angie Chai
| executive_producer   = 
| editor               = 
| location             = Shanghai, ChinaLondon, United Kingdom
| cinematography       = 
| runtime              = 45 minutes
| company              = 
| channel              = Hunan Television (China) 
Netflix (Worldwide)
| picture_format       = 
| audio_format         = 
| first_aired          = 
| last_aired           = 
| related              = Boys Over Flowers "Hana Yori Dango" (1992 manga, 1996 anime, 1997 animated film; Japan)  Hana Yori Dango (1995 film, Japan)  Meteor Garden (2001, Taiwan)  Meteor Garden II (2002, Taiwan)  Hana Yori Dango (2005, Japan)  Hana Yori Dango Returns (2007, Japan)  Hana Yori Dango Final (2008, Japan)  Boys Over Flowers (2009, South Korea)  Hana Nochi Hare: HanaDan Next Season (2018, Japan)  F4 Thailand: Boys Over Flowers (2021, Thailand)
| budget               = $33 million
| image_size           = 210
}}Meteor Garden is a 2018 mainland Chinese television series starring Shen Yue, Dylan Wang, Darren Chen, Caesar Wu, and Connor Leong. The series is based on the Japanese shōjo manga series  written by Yoko Kamio, and a remake of the 2001 Taiwanese series of the same name. The series is produced by the maker of the original Taiwanese series Angie Chai and directed by Lin Helong. It is set in Shanghai and London.

The series reboot was first broadcast in China on Hunan Television, then made available after its airing to VIP users of its streaming counterpart, Mango TV. The stream was then made available to everyone the day after it aired. Two episodes were released per day on a Monday to Wednesday basis. It is also available globally via Netflix.

 Plot 
The story centers around an ordinary girl, Dong Shancai (Shen Yue), who is accepted into the most prestigious university in the country, Ming De University. Shancai is a girl from a family that barely makes ends meet. Due to the nature of her personality, she immediately clashes with F4, an elite clique composed of the four most popular boys in the institution, especially its spoiled, rich and arrogant leader - Daoming Si (Dylan Wang). Gradually, Daoming Si falls deeply in love with Shancai, only to realize that she is in love with one of his best friends, Huaze Lei (Darren Chen).

Eventually, the four boys begin to acknowledge Shancai's unyielding personality that is like her namesake: a weed that can never be brought down. Shancai begins to see the good in the boys, paving the way for friendships and an eventual romance. However, Daoming Si's mother strongly disapproves of Shancai due to her social status and family background, thus the former doing all things in order to break Shancai and Daoming Si's relationship.

Cast
Main

Supporting
Wang Lin 王琳 as Daoming Feng 道明枫
Dee Hsu as Daoming Zhuang 道明莊
Li Jiaqi 厉嘉琪 as Jiang Xiaoyou 蒋小优
Liu Yinhao 刘尹昊 as Chen Qinghe 陈青和
Dong Xin 董馨 as Li Zhen 李真
Sun Qian 孙千 as He Yuanzi 何原姿 (小姿）
Lin Peng 林鹏 as Dong Danian 董大年 - Shancai's father
Zhang Li 张莉 as Shancai's mother
Sun Yihan 孙伊涵 as Tengtang Jing 腾唐静
Wang Runze 王润泽 as Tian Ye 田野
Blake Abbie as Thomas 托马斯
Wang Yunhua 王韵华 as Jiang Baihe 江百合
An Ziyi 安紫依 as Li Xinhui 李心惠
Yang Guang 杨光 as Yu Sao 玉嫂
Liu Ye 刘烨 as Zhou Caina 周彩娜
Wang Dong 王东 as Ye Mingchuan 叶明川
Zhao Huaran 赵奂然 as Yan Shunping 颜舜平 
Jin Haochen 金澔辰 as Yan Zhibu 颜之步
Dai Yaqi 戴雅琪 as Geng Yifen 耿怡芬 (小更)
Cai Huiquan 蔡慧泉 as Young Dong Shancai 董杉菜（童年）
Liu Huahua 刘画画 as Young Daoming Si 道明寺（童年）
Zhang Bowen 张博文 as Young HuaZe Lei 花泽类（童年）
Bei Jiaxin 裴佳欣 as Young Tengtang Jing 腾唐静（童年）

Cameo
Harlem Yu
Amber Kuo
Tang Jingmei
Wang Yue 王月 as Sister Yue 月姐

Production 
In April 2017, Angie Chai announced the remake of Meteor Garden'', which she produced in 2001. Prior to the announcement, Barbie Hsu hinted at the news on her Weibo account. Chai planned on making the remake a "fuller —and flashier— adaptation of the books". The drama was budgeted at 720 million New Taiwan dollars (about US$24 million) with 15 million per episode, thirty times higher than the original.

A casting call was announced on social media on June 21, 2017 with a video and the topic, "#FindingF4". On November 7, 2017, the actors playing F4 were revealed, namely Dylan Wang (Daoming Si), Darren Chen (Huaze Lei), Caesar Wu (Ximen Yan) and Connor Leong (Feng Meizuo). Shen Yue's role as Dong Shancai was unveiled at a press conference in Shanghai on November 9.

Dee Hsu auditioned for the role of Daoming Feng and was cast as Daoming Zhuang. The role of Daoming Feng was eventually portrayed by actress Wang Lin (Lilian Wang).

In February 2018, it was announced that the director had been changed from Xu Fuxiang to Lin Helong.

Original soundtrack

Reception

Ratings
In this table,  represent the lowest ratings and  represent the highest ratings.

In China, ratings of at least 1.0% is considered high due to its large population and numerous TV share.

References

External links 
 
 

2018 Chinese television series debuts
Boys Over Flowers
Chinese romantic comedy television series
2018 Chinese television series endings
Television shows filmed in England
Television shows filmed in Shanghai
Television series reboots
Television series about bullying